James Field may refer to:

James Field (criminal) (1714–1751), boxer and criminal from Ireland
James G. Field (1826–1901), American politician from Virginia
James C. Field, American photographer
James A. Field (1880–1927), American economist
James Field (baseball) (born 1890), American baseball player
James A. Field Jr. (c. 1916–1996), American historian
Jamie Field (born 1976), rugby league footballer

See also
James Fields (disambiguation)